Comfort Owusu (born 28 April 1940) is a Ghanaian politician and a member of the Third Parliament
of the Fourth Republic representing the Mfantsiman East Constituency in the Central Region of Ghana.

Early life and education 
Owusu was born in 1940 in the Mfantsiman East in the Central region of Ghana. She attended Morris School of Hairdressing & Culture where she obtained her Diploma degree in Culture & Beauty.

Politics 
Owusu is a member of the 1st, 2nd and 3rd parliament of the 4th republic of Ghana. Her political career started in 1992 when she became a member of parliament for the Mfantsiman constituency of the central region on the Ticket of the National Convention party. She contested again in the 1996 and 2000 Ghanaian General elections representing the Mfantsiman East Constituency and retained her seat on the ticket of the National Democratic Congress. She has won the seat of the Member of Parliament for the Mfanstiman East constituency three consecutive times. In 2000, she polled a total votes of 7,110 votes in the Ghanaian general elections.

Career 
Owusu is a Beautician and a Former member of Parliament for the Mfantsiman East Constituency in the Central Region of Ghana.

Personal life 
Owusu is a Christian.

References

1940 births
Living people
National Democratic Congress (Ghana) politicians
People from Central Region (Ghana)
Ghanaian MPs 2001–2005
Ghanaian MPs 1997–2001
Ghanaian Christians
Ghanaian MPs 1993–1997